Woodloch may refer to:

Woodloch, Texas, a town in Montgomery County, Texas
Woodloch Pines, a resort located in the Poconos in Pennsylvania